Phyllospora is a genus of seaweeds in the family Seirococcaceae (among the brown algae). 

Five species are currently accepted:

 Phyllospora chamissoi C.Agardh, 1839
 Phyllospora comosa (Labillardière) C.Agardh, 1839
 Phyllospora obtusa (Harvey) Endlicher
 Phyllospora menziesii (Turner) C.Agardh, 1839 accepted as Egregia menziesii (Turner) Areschoug, 1876 (synonym)
 Phyllospora quercifolia (Turner) Harvey (uncertain)

References

Fucales
Fucales genera
Taxa named by Carl Adolph Agardh